Sonja Mugosa (born April 12, 1989 in Paris, France) is a former competitive figure skater who has competed internationally for Montenegro, Serbia, and Serbia and Montenegro. She is the 2007 Serbian national gold medalist. She began competing for Montenegro in the 2008-2009 season.

Competitive highlights

For Montenegro

Results for Serbia

Results for Serbia and Montenegro

References

External links
 

1989 births
Living people
Sportspeople from Paris
Serbian female single skaters
Montenegrin figure skaters